General William Wylde CB (12 March 1788 – 14 April 1877) was Master Gunner, St James's Park, the most senior Ceremonial Post in the Royal Artillery after the Sovereign.

Military career
Wylde was commissioned into the Royal Artillery in 1803 and rose through the officer ranks to become a Lieutenant-General in 1863. In the First Carlist War, he was British Commissioner to the Christinist Army, and played a significant role as artilleryman in relieving the siege of Bilbao by Carlist forces.

He was made Colonel Commandant of the Royal Artillery in 1863 and promoted to full General in 1866, and then held the position of Master Gunner, St James's Park from 1868.

He was also a Groom of the Bedchamber to the Prince Consort.

He died in 1877 and is buried in Brompton Cemetery in London.

Family
Wylde was a member of a Nottinghamshire family, the second son of Gervas Wylde and Catherine née Shudall. He married Eleanor MacCutcheon and they had three sons and three daughters. Eldest son William Henry Wylde (1819–1909) of Chiswick distinguished himself in the Foreign Office.

References

1794 births
1877 deaths
Royal Artillery officers
British Army generals
Companions of the Order of the Bath
Burials at Brompton Cemetery
Military personnel of the First Carlist War
Members of the British Royal Household
British Army personnel of the Napoleonic Wars
Equerries